The 2005–06 FA Cup qualifying rounds opened the 125th season of competition in England for 'The Football Association Challenge Cup' (FA Cup), the world's oldest association football single knockout competition. A total of 674 clubs were accepted for the competition, up 13 from the previous season’s 661.

The large number of clubs entering the tournament from lower down (Levels 5 through 11) in the English football pyramid meant that the competition started with six rounds of preliminary (2) and qualifying (4) knockouts for these non-League teams. South Western Football League was the only level 11 league represented in the Cup, seven clubs from the South Western Football League were the lowest-ranked clubs in competition. The 32 winning teams from Fourth qualifying round progressed to the First round proper, where League teams tiered at Levels 3 and 4 entered the competition.

Calendar

Extra preliminary round
Matches played on Friday/Saturday/Sunday 19 to 21 August 2005. 172 clubs from Level 9, Level 10 and Level 11 of English football, entered at this stage of the competition, while other 189 clubs from levels 9-11 get a bye to the preliminary round.

Preliminary round
Matches played on weekend of Saturday 27 August 2005. A total of 364 clubs took part in this stage of the competition, including the 86 winners from the Extra preliminary round, 189 clubs from Levels 9-11, who get a bye in the extra preliminary round and 89 entering at this stage from the four divisions at Level 8 of English football. The round featured five clubs from Level 11 (all from the South Western Football League) still in the competition, being the lowest ranked clubs in this round.

First qualifying round
Matches on weekend of Saturday 10 September 2005. A total of 248 clubs took part in this stage of the competition, including the 182 winners from the Preliminary round and 66 entering at this stage from the top division of the three leagues at Level 7 of English football. The round featured five clubs from Level 11 (all from the South Western Football League) still in the competition, being the lowest ranked clubs in this round.

Second qualifying round
Matches played on weekend of Saturday 24 September 2005. A total of 168 clubs took part in this stage of the competition, including the 124 winners from the first qualifying round and 44 Level 6 clubs, from Conference North and Conference South, entering at this stage. Great Harwood Town, Hebburn Town and Staveley Miners Welfare from Level 10 of English football were the lowest-ranked clubs to qualify for this round of the competition.

Third qualifying round
Matches played on weekend of Saturday 8 October 2005. A total of 84 clubs took part, all having progressed from the second qualifying round. The round featured twelve clubs from Level 9 still in the competition, being the lowest ranked clubs in this round.

Fourth qualifying round
Matches played on weekend of Saturday 22 October 2005. A total of 64 clubs took part, 42 having progressed from the third qualifying round and 22 clubs from Conference Premier, forming Level 5 of English football, entering at this stage. Bishop's Cleeve, Chasetown and Leamington from Level 9 of English football were the lowest-ranked clubs to qualify for this round of the competition.

Competition proper
See 2005–06 FA Cup for details of the rounds from the first round proper onwards.

External links
 Football Club History Database: FA Cup 2005–06
 The FA Cup Archive

FA Cup qualifying rounds
Qual